The Marika Kotopouli Museum is a modern art museum in Zografou, Athens, Greece. The building housing the museum was built by the famous Greek theater actress Marika Kotopouli (1887–1954) as her holiday home in 1926. During the Second World War, the house was requisitioned by the Germans and after the war it housed the local Police Station. The Zographou Municipality with support of the Association of Greek Actors restored the building with its distinctive architecture and beautiful interiors. In 1990, it opened to the public as a museum of modern art. It hosts various interim art exhibitions as well as the permanent collection of Konstantinos Ioannides.

External links
Hellenic Ministry of Culture and Tourism

Museums in Athens
Art museums and galleries in Greece
Art museums established in 1990
1990 establishments in Greece